Classics Live is the fifth solo album by former Supertramp songwriter and co-founder Roger Hodgson, and his second live album.

Overview
Classics Live is a collection of his live performances from acoustic, band and orchestra shows recorded on his 2010 world tour. David Wild, contributing editor at Rolling Stone magazine, said of Classics Live: "...An utterly inspired collection of live performances of the best-loved songs that Roger Hodgson has written and sung to date, Classics Live reminds us in the most vivid way who brought the world such beloved rock standards as "Give a Little Bit", "Take the Long Way Home", "The Logical Song" and "Dreamer" and why these shining songs endure as deeply personal yet somehow universal expression of longing, love and our endless search for human connection."

The successor to Classics Live − Classics Live 2 − is to be released soon.

Track listing
All songs written by Roger Hodgson.

"Take the Long Way Home" 4:55
Belo Horizonte, Brazil with band
"Give a Little Bit" 4:21
Oslo, Norway with band
"Hide in Your Shell" 6:59
Valencia, Venezuela with band
"Breakfast in America" 2:43
Belo Horizonte, Brazil with band
"Only Because of You" / "Lord Is It Mine" 6:00
Solo in Paris, France
"The Logical Song" 4:09
Belo Horizonte, Brazil with band
"School" 5:48
Babelsberg, Germany with orchestra
"Dreamer" 4:34
Valencia, Venezuela with band
"Two of Us" 2:43
Solo in Bremen, Germany
"It's Raining Again" 4:44
Belo Horizonte, Brazil with band

Personnel
 Roger Hodgson: vocals, 12 string guitar, piano, keyboards
 Kevin Adamson: keyboards, backing vocals
 Aaron MacDonald: saxophones, keyboards, melodica, backing vocals
 Ian Stewart: bass
 Bryan Head: drums

Production
 Producer: Roger Hodgson
 Recording engineer: Howard Heckers
 Mixing engineer: Denis Tougas
 Assisted by: Marc Eijkelenboom
 Mastering engineer: George Seara
 Mixed at Phase One Studios, Toronto

References

External links

Roger Hodgson Official Website
Roger Hodgson Official Channel

Roger Hodgson albums
2010 live albums
Live albums by English artists